The Mauch Chunk and Summit Railroad was a coal-hauling railroad in the mountains of Pennsylvania that operated between 1828 and 1932. It was the first operational railway, in the United States, of any substantial length to carry paying passengers.

A private line which moved coal for the Lehigh Coal & Navigation Company on  gauge track, it was not a common carrier which linked with other railroads. The rail line was laid on top of the company's earlier -constant-descent-graded wagon road. The railroad operated for over a hundred years until the middle of the Great Depression.

History 
The Mauch Chunk was the second permanent United States railroad and the first over five miles long.

Early days: 1828-1845 
Like its rival the B&O Railroad, the Mauch Chunk at first used animal power. Mules hauled the empty coal tubs to the summit and were sent down in the last batch of cars; the return trip required 4–5 hours. The road would send down groups of 6–8 coal cars under control of a brakeman, and once 40–42 cars were down, send down the special "mule cars" with the draft animals, thus having just enough animals to return all cars back to the top.

The railway used gravity and two inclines. A powered double-incline led up to the top of two separate summits along Pisgah Ridge on the return leg and each summit had "a new down track" returning the cars several miles farther west in each case. This saw-tooth elevation profile gave the new return track a swooping characteristic ride later deliberately designed into roller coasters. About the same time, when other mine heads were opened in lower elevations of the Panther Creek Valley LC&N added several descending switchback sections and other shorter cable railway climbing inclines to bring the coal up from the new Lansford and Coaldale mines to the Summit Hill loading area for the gravity railway trip down to Mauch Chunk, thence to the Lehigh Canal (and in 1855, by rail transport) and their customers. The railroad became an early American tourist attraction and is considered the world's first roller coaster, a role it would keep and satisfy with tourists for over five decades after it was abandoned as a primary freight railroad.

1846-1871 

By 1845 the increasing demand for coal and the poor logistics of a single-track route meant the company needed to improve its railroad. In 1846, they built a new uphill line using two steam-powered, Josiah White engineered  funicular systems to replace move cars uphill. These inclines used two telescoping wheeled Barney pusher cars attached to the cables by steel tow-bands running between two large diameter winch wheels located in the Barney tunnels. When a car was ready to ascend, it was drifted down the slight incline from above and behind the Barney tunnel to wait at a latch. The barneys came up and coupled behind to push the cars uphill. One of the inclines rose  up Mount Pisgah, and the other crossed Mount Jefferson.  The downhill trip continued to be powered by gravity.  The up track was equipped with a ratchet which would prevent a car that detached from the cable from running away down hill.  This invention later evolved into the anti-rollback device used on roller coasters. The railroad changed its name to the Mauch Chunk, Summit Hill and Switchback Railroad.  The modernization of the railroad reduced a passenger round-trip from 4.5 hours to just 80 minutes.

1872-closure 

In 1872, the Panther Creek Railroad opened as a replacement for the switchback line.

The Lehigh Coal and Railroad is considered the first American company to use vertical integration—providing raw materials, shipping, processing and final goods.

Some famous personalities who visited the railroad include Prince Maximilian of Wied, President Ulysses S. Grant, William Astor (son of John Jacob Astor), and Thomas Edison.
The Central Railroad of New Jersey (CNJ) purchased it in 1874 and leased it to brothers Theodore and H. L. Mumford who operated the line as a tourist attraction.  On May 24, 1929, the CNJ sold the line to the new Mauch Chunk Switchback Railway Company, which operated until 1932, when the line fell victim to the Great Depression.  The mortgage on the property foreclosed and it was sold to scrapper Isaac Weiner for $18,000 (equal to $ today).

National Register of Historic Places 
In 1976, a  section of the former right-of-way, from Ludlow St. in Summit Hill to F.A.P. 209 in Jim Thorpe, was listed on the National Register of Historic Places as "Mauch Chunk and Summit Hill Switchback Railroad".  The listed area included four contributing sites.

The right-of-way is now the Switchback Railroad Trail.

Notes

Gallery

References

Sources

External links

 Lehigh Coal and Navigation Company Records in  Beyond Steel: An Archive of Lehigh Valley Industry and Culture.
 Early Mining Pictures – Anthracite Mining pictorial: Mines & Structures operated by the L.C.& N., Summit Hill, Lansford and Coaldale, Pennsylvania.
 Switch-Back Gravity Railroad: Proprietary photos touring the LC&N built Summit Hill & Mauch Chunk Railroad, the 2nd railway in North America
  - local historian, documents many scenes along the 18 mile round trip of the railway's loop.

Rail infrastructure on the National Register of Historic Places in Pennsylvania
Defunct Pennsylvania railroads
Railway lines opened in 1827
Transportation in Carbon County, Pennsylvania
3 ft 6 in gauge railways in the United States
National Register of Historic Places in Carbon County, Pennsylvania
Railway lines on the National Register of Historic Places
1827 establishments in Pennsylvania